Charles Mason (October 5, 1908 – November 6, 1999) was an American rower. He competed in the men's coxed four event at the 1928 Summer Olympics. He graduated from Harvard University.

References

External links
 

1908 births
1999 deaths
American male rowers
Olympic rowers of the United States
Rowers at the 1928 Summer Olympics
Rowers from Boston
Harvard Crimson rowers